Gemma Galdón-Clavell (born 1976) is a Spanish technology policy analyst who specializes in ethics and algorithmic accountability. She is a senior adviser to the European Commission and she has also provided advice to other international organisations. Forbes Magazine described her as “a leading voice on tech ethics and algorithmic accountability”.

Biography 
Galdón was born in Mataró in 1976.

After completing a BA in Contemporary History and a MA in Public Management at the Autonomous University of Barcelona. Galdón also completed her PhD there concerning surveillance, security and urban policy. She was also appointed Director of the Security Policy Programme and MA in Security Policy at the Universitat Oberta de Catalunya (UOC). In 2008 she was the coordinator of the Barcelona office of the United Nations' Institute for Training and Research (UNITAR).

She is the founder and CEO of Eticas Foundation and Eticas Consulting, organisations focused on identifying black box algorithmic vulnerabilities and retrain AI-powered technology with better source data and content. In 2017 she was a finalist for the EU's prize for women innovators.

In 2020, Galdón was elected to the Ashoka Fellowship. According to this organization she is “changing the way technology is created through her innovative algorithms audit methodology”. She is working to ensure that there is an ethical consideration when algorithmic tools are used. She is concerned with how security, resilience, policing and privacy are considered in smart cities. The BBC selected her as one of the “people changing the world” in 2020. Forbes Magazine described her as “a leading voice on tech ethics and algorithmic accountability”. She noted that "I'm just the tech guy" is not a valid excuse for algorithm's behaving unfairly and that audits of algorithms should be a regular and essential safety procedure.

Galdón is the co-author of several books and book chapters and she is also a frequent columnist in the Spanish media. In May 2021, she and colleague Emma Lopez, were addressing the Response-ability Summit which aimed to "champion socially responsible tech" on their approach to making Artificial Intelligence accountable using audits.

Between 2014 and 2016, Galdón was a member of the state council of political party Podemos; in 2014, she was responsible for the Technology, Privacy and Security Area.  In 2014, she revealed on Twitter her monthly pay statement from University of Barcelona of 600 euros to protest low academic funding.

In 2021, her Eticas Foundation has launched a database of governmental algorithms called Observatory of Algorithms with Social Impact (OASI).

References 
 

Living people
1976 births
People from Barcelona
People from Mataró
Autonomous University of Barcelona alumni
Open government activists
Spanish women company founders